There were a number of American volunteers in the Rhodesian Bush War who fought with the Rhodesian Security Forces. These men were nick-named the Crippled Eagles by author Robin Moore, who offered a house in Salisbury as a meeting place for the Americans who served in all units of the security forces, but never had their own unit. The name "Crippled Eagle" and their badge was meant to symbolise what they considered their abandonment by the US government. Robin Moore and Barbara Fuca tried to publish a book with the same title, but because of the political controversy the book was refused by publishers and appeared only in 1991, when it was published as The White Tribe.

Background

One of the reasons for many of the American citizens who joined the Crippled Eagles was the Soldier of Fortune reports about both the Rhodesian Bush War and the means of entry into the Rhodesian Army. From 1976 to 1980 almost every issue contained one or more articles about the ongoing conflict. The first issue of the magazine in 1975 actually contained two such articles, prompting some Americans to travel to Rhodesia. After 1980, their attention turned to Angola, Soweto and other hotspots around the world.

Approximately 300 Americans, some with previous combat experience in Vietnam and other theatres, others with none, volunteered to fight in the Rhodesian Security Forces during the Rhodesian Bush War as ordinary soldiers, earning a pay packet in local currency equal to that of a Rhodesian regular, under the same conditions of service. The Americans suffered seven combat fatalities and many others were wounded in combat, some maimed for life. Five served in Rhodesia's most prestigious unit, the Selous Scouts.

The United States' Neutrality Act prohibits American citizens from enlisting with foreign militaries or working as mercenaries for other governments. Despite this, the United States government did little to slow the flow of volunteers to Rhodesia. There is evidence that the Departments of Justice and State tacitly encouraged Americans to volunteer for Rhodesia as part of efforts to prevent the country's collapse prior to a negotiated solution to the war. The Carter Administration considered taking steps to stop Americans serving with Rhodesia, but this did not result in any policy changes. The activities of Americans in Rhodesia were widely publicised in the United States, leading to protests. 

Many of the American volunteers wrongly believed that their government opposed their presence in the country, with articles in Soldier of Fortune and works by Robin Moore also claiming this. In 1976 Moore established what he called the "Unofficial US Embassy" in Salisbury, and began hosting events for the American volunteers as well as doctoral students. He encouraged the volunteers to call themselves 'Crippled Eagles' due to the perception that they were being harassed, or could be harassed, by their government. He also sold t-shirts, sew-on patches and other merchandise using the 'Crippled Eagle' motif and wrote a book that argued that Rhodesia was not racist which included profiles of foreign volunteers.

Like the other foreign volunteers in Rhodesia, the Americans often received a hostile reception from their comrades in Rhodesian units. This led to some of the Americans deserting before the end of their contract.

Members killed

During the course of its existence the following American citizens died in Rhodesia:

Notes

Citations

Works cited

Further reading

Foreign volunteers in the Rhodesian Security Forces
Rhodesia–United States relations